Susan Wheeler (born July 16, 1955) is an educator and award-winning poet whose poems have frequently appeared in anthologies.  She is currently the Director of Creative Writing at Princeton University.  She has also taught at University of Iowa, NYU, Rutgers, Columbia University and The New School.

Wheeler was born in Pittsburgh and grew up throughout Minnesota and New England. She received a BA from Bennington College in 1977 and pursued graduate studies in art history at the University of Chicago between 1979 and 1981.

Wheeler was the first example of an Elliptical Poet described by Stephanie Burt in her creation of the term in 1998. and expanded upon in an eponymous essay in American Letters & Commentary.  Her work is also referred to in Jed Rasula's Syncopations: The Stress of Innovation in Contemporary American Poetry.

Awards and honors
1978-79 Vermont Councill of the Arts grantee
1987 Grolier award for poetry
1988 Prize for Poetry, Roberts Foundation
1990 Fund for Poetry grantee
1993 New York Foundation for the Arts fellow (1993–95, 1997–99)
1994 Norma Farber First Book Award, Bag o' Diamonds
1994 Pushcart Prize, Bag o' Diamonds
1999 Guggenheim Foundation Fellow
2000 Pushcart Prize, Bag o' Diamonds
2012 National Book Award (Poetry), finalist, Meme

Her poems have appeared in The Best American Poetry series in these editions: 1988, 1991, 1993, 1996, 1998, The Best of the Best American Poetry 1988–1997,  2003,  2005.

Works
Bag of Diamonds (poetry), University of Georgia Press, 1993
Smokes (poetry), Four Way Books, 1998
Source Codes (poetry), Salt, 2001
Ledger (poetry), Iowa, 2005
Record Palace (novel), Graywolf, 2005
Assorted Poems (poetry), Farrar, Straus and Giroux, 2010
Meme (poetry), Iowa, 2012

References

1955 births
Living people
21st-century American women
American women academics
American women poets
Bennington College alumni
Formalist poets
The New Yorker people
Princeton University faculty
University of Chicago alumni
Writers from Pittsburgh